After the Winter is a 2021 Montenegrin drama film directed by Ivan Bakrač. It was selected as the Montenegrin entry for the Best International Feature Film at the 94th Academy Awards.

Plot
Five childhood friends remain closely connected despite relocating to different parts of what was formerly Yugoslavia.

Cast
 Momcilo Otasevic as Mladen
 Petar Buric as Danilo
 Maja Susa as Bubi
 Ana Vuckovic as Marija
 Ivona Kustudic as Jana

See also
 List of submissions to the 94th Academy Awards for Best International Feature Film
 List of Montenegrin submissions for the Academy Award for Best International Feature Film

References

External links
 

2021 films
2021 drama films
Montenegrin drama films
Serbo-Croatian-language films